The 2023 New York Red Bulls season will be the club's twenty-eighth season in Major League Soccer, the top division of soccer in the United States.

Team information

Squad information

Appearances and goals are career totals from all-competitions.

Roster transactions

In

Out

Preseason and Friendlies

Major League Soccer season

Eastern Conference

Overall

Results summary

Matches

Leagues Cup

East 4

Competitions summary

Player statistics
As of March 18, 2023

|-
! colspan="14" style="background:#dcdcdc; text-align:center"| Goalkeepers

|-
! colspan="14" style="background:#dcdcdc; text-align:center"| Defenders

|-
! colspan="14" style="background:#dcdcdc; text-align:center"| Midfielders

|-
! colspan="14" style="background:#dcdcdc; text-align:center"| Forwards

|}

Top scorers

As of 18 March 2023

Assist leaders

As of 18 March 2023

Cleansheets

As of 18 March 2023

References

New York Red Bulls seasons
2023 Major League Soccer season
New York Red Bulls